Ishar Chander Sharma was a saint from Manavta Mandir Hoshiarpur, Punjab, India. Faqir Chand, a sant of the Sant Mat tradition, appointed him as a successor through his will dated 20 April 1980. With a PhD on Jain Philosopshy under PT Raju, Sharma specialized in epistemology and ethical philosophies of India.

Sharma was a philosopher by profession. He held various academic positions at the Claremont College (visiting professor), University of Rajasthan,  University of Udaipur (Chairman, Department of Philosophy), Christopher Newport , Virginia (visiting professor), Lynchburg College, visiting professor Cleveland State University, Ohio]]Visiting professor, Dyke College, Cleveland and Old Dominion University, Virginia. He also served as the president of the Indian Philosophical Congress for some time.

Sharma first met his guru, Faqir Chand, when Faqir was delivering a sermon in New Delhi. Sharma said that his meeting with Faqir was unusual because Faqir interrupted the sermon to shout Sharma's name, asking Sharma to join him on the stage. Sharma could not understand how this sant knew his name as they had never met or known about each other before this meeting. Later, Faqir told Sharma that he had been waiting for him.

Faqir visited Sharma in the US on many occasions and nominated him to work in his place in presence or absence of Munshi Ram, a co-successor, once he retired from teaching and returned to India. Sharma traveled worldwide to propagate the teachings of Faqir, Radha Soami Mat and Surat Shabd Yoga until his death in December 2000.

Books 
 Ethical Philosophies of India
 Cayce, Karma and Reincarnation

See also 
 Rai Saligram
 Shiv Brat Lal

References

External links 
 https://web.archive.org/web/20110325003724/http://manavtamandirhsp.com/
 http://www.babafaqirchand.com/baba.html
 http://akhandmanavatadham.in/manav_dayal

2000 deaths
20th-century Indian philosophers
Radha Soami
Surat Shabd Yoga
Academic staff of Mohanlal Sukhadia University